R. Selvaraj, also credited as "Annakili" Selvaraj, is an Indian screenwriter and director. He worked predominantly in the Tamil film industry, as well as in very few  Tollywood, and Kannada film industries. His most famous film is Annakili. Vijayakanth's film career started with Selvaraj's 1979 release Agal Vilakku. He appeared in Doorathu Idi Muzhakkam. Selvaraj also worked closely with Barathiraja and Manirathnam. His son Dinesh Selvaraj is a director who has made films like Thuppakki Munai.

Filmography

Story
 Engamma Sapatham - 1974
Ammayila Sapatham - 1975 (Telugu)
Annakili - 1976
Kavikkuyil - 1977
 Kizhakke Pogum Rail - 1978
 Puthiya Vaarpugal - 1979
 Toorpu Velle Railu - 1979
 Kotha Jeevithalu - 1980 (Telugu)
 Nanna Devaru - 1982 (Kannada)
 Pudhumai Penn - 1984
 Idaya Kovil - 1985
 Udaya Geetham - 1985
 Muthal Mariyathai - 1985
 Geethanjali - 1985
 Paadu Nilave - 1987
 Kodi Parakuthu - 1988
 Sone Pe Suhaaga - 1988 (Hindi)
 Pudhu Nellu Pudhu Naathu - 1991
Pudhu Manithan - 1991
 Chinna Gounder - 1992
Chinarayudu - 1992 (Telugu)
 Captain Magal - 1993
 Sakkarai Devan - 1993
 Koyil Kaalai - 1993
Raasaiyya - 1995
Anthimanthaarai - 1996
Mommaga - 1997 (Kannada)
Agni IPS - 1997 (Kannada)
Azhagarsamy - 1999
Taj Mahal - 1999
Alaipayuthey - 2000
Pottu Amman - 2000
 Eera Nilam - 2003

Direction
Ponnu Oorukku Pudhusu - 1979
 Agal Vilakku - 1979
Bhagavathipuram Railway Gate - 1983
Neethana Andha Kuyil - 1986
 Sigappu Nirathil Chinnappoo - 1990

References

External links
 
 கடல் தொடாத நதி - 5

Indian film directors
Indian screenwriters
Tamil film directors
Tamil-language film directors
Tamil screenwriters
Telugu film directors
20th-century Indian film directors
21st-century Indian film directors
Film directors from Tamil Nadu
Screenwriters from Tamil Nadu
Year of birth missing (living people)
Living people